Eat a Bowl of Tea is a 1961 novel by Louis Chu. It was the first Chinese American novel set in Chinese America. Because of its portrayal of the "bachelor society" in New York's Chinatown after World War II, it has become an important work in Asian American studies. It has been cited as an influence by such authors as Frank Chin and Maxine Hong Kingston. It was made into a film of the same name by Wayne Wang in 1989.

The novel focuses on four primary characters: a young married couple, Ben Loy and Mei Oi, and their fathers, Wah Gay and Lee Gong. Chu uses their stories to illuminate conflicts between Chinese ideals and traditions and contemporary American society.

Explanation on the novel's title
The title of the novel comes into play when Ben Loy takes the initiative to ask a Chinese herb specialist, Dr. Suey, if he has anything that would cure his impotence. The doctor responds, "Eat a bowl of tea and we'll get you on the way to recovery" (244). Although the tea is "thick, black, bitter...[and] not easy to swallow" (246), Ben Loy "kept going back to the herb doctor uncomplainingly" (246). Whether it is the beneficial effect of the tea or a change in Ben Loy himself, Ben Loy regains his manhood at the conclusion of the novel.

"Eating" this tea represents Ben Loy breaking the rules and regulations of Chinese customs – rather than drink the tea, he "eats" it. Additionally, it represents Ben Loy's decision to release himself from the pressure and control of his father and independently create a life for himself and his family. By doing so, Ben Loy regains his masculinity both literally and figuratively.

Plot summary
Eat a Bowl of Tea begins by describing newlyweds Ben Loy and Mei Oi sleeping peacefully in their bed in New York City. They are abruptly awakened by a prostitute ringing the doorbell. Ben Loy, ashamed of his pre-marital history with prostitutes, lies to protect his secret from his "innocent, pure" wife.

The story then jumps backwards several months to the "Money Come" gambling house and the men who spend their days there: Wah Gay, Lee Gong, Chong Loo and Ah Song. The text depicts the close friendship between Wah Gay and Lee Gong (both Chinese immigrants with wives back in Guangdong (Canton)), and a conversation concerning their unmarried children ensues. Upon learning that Wah Gay has a marriageable son (Ben Loy) here in the States, Lee Gong spies on him at his restaurant and decides that he is the right man for his daughter (Mei Oi), who is still in China. He and Wah Gay decide that Ben Loy will go to China and bring back Mei Oi as his bride. The two men write their wives (Lau Shee and Jung Shee) in anticipation.

Although Ben Loy seems to be the epitome of a "good boy," he has a secret life. When he is not busy working at the restaurant (in the fictional suburb of Stanton, Connecticut), he and his roommate Chin Yuen visit white prostitutes in New York City, a habit Ben Loy picked up while serving in the Army during World War II. Ben Loy becomes addicted to these sexual flings, often sleeping with numerous prostitutes in a night. Without the permission of his father  – who wants Ben Loy to stay in Stanton, away from the temptations of New York – Ben Loy and Chin Yuen move to an apartment on Manhattan's Catherine Street.

When Wah Gay approaches Ben Loy about going to Sunwei, China to find a bride, Ben Loy is skeptical and unwilling. But he eventually warms to the idea of bringing a bride with him back to America and raising a family, and he assents to his family's wish. When he meets Mei Oi in China, he decides that he made the right decision – he is immediately enthralled by her beauty and pleased by her modesty and courtesy. After such ceremonial practices as the employment of matchmakers and the approval of the Fourth Uncle, the families plan a traditional wedding. Their Chinese wedding is mirrored by a Chinese wedding banquet back in Chinatown.

Her arrival in New York should be a happy time for Mei Oi, as she is finally able to meet her father and to experience life in a big city. However, she feels lonely in the city and spends her days sobbing over her deteriorating marriage, not understanding the causes of Ben Loy's impotence. Although they made love during their first few weeks of marriage, since their arrival in New York he no longer appears to desire her affection, even when she attempts to arouse him. This rejection deeply hurts, frustrates and confuses Mei Oi, and she concludes that Ben Loy no longer loves her. It is not long before the novelty of living in Chinatown and marrying a gimshunhock ("Gold Mountain sojourner"—someone living in America) wears off. Mei Oi insists that Ben Loy consult a doctor about his impotency – he tries both an American doctor and a Chinese herb specialist, but to no avail.

In July, an unexpected visitor appears at their apartment: Ah Song, a frequent Money Come guest who flirts shamelessly with Mei Oi while Ben Loy is at work, claiming to be deeply in love with her and divulging Ben Loy's secret shameful past. Confused and overpowered, Mei Oi is raped by Ah Song. In spite of the rape, they kindle a relationship and a secret affair begins.

Mei Oi soon discovers that she is pregnant, but does not know who the father is (since she and Ben Loy had successfully slept together during a visit to Washington, D.C.). She continues her affair with Ah Song, oblivious to the increasing gossip that she is "knitting Ben Loy a green hat" – sleeping with another man. Eventually Soon Lee Gong, Wah Gay, and finally Ben Loy learn of the affair. The tong mocks the family and Mei Oi realizes the magnitude of shame she has brought upon them.

The neighborhood eventually assumes the identity of the man as Ah Song, and Ben Loy and Mei Oi move to Stanton to avoid further embarrassment. Even the affections of Chin Yuen, Ben Loy's closest companion, cannot distract Mei Oi from the pain she feels away from Ah Song, and she eventually convinces Ben Loy to move back to New York.

Back in the old apartment, the affair resumes right where it left off. Wah Gay, crazed by the shame this affair has brought upon his family, lurks near the apartment and attacks Ah Song as he leaves, slicing off his ear. When Ah Song presses charges, Wah Gay flees to a friend's home in New Jersey. However, because he is so well-connected in his tong through multitudes of devoted and powerful family members, he is not penalized for his actions. Ah Song, on the other hand, is exiled for five years. But Wah Gay and Lee Gong are too embarrassed to remain in the community and leave New York, heading their separate ways in solitude.

Ben Loy and Mei Oi decide to free themselves of all family and community ties by starting anew in San Francisco. The birth of their child, Kuo Ming, and a new environment allow them to grow closer and mend previous wrongs. Ben Loy visits another Chinese herb specialist and decides to take the doctor's advice and "eat a bowl of tea" to treat his impotence. Whether it is the herbs or the increase in Ben Loy's independence, his masculinity is finally restored in all senses of the word.

Major characters
In order of prevalence and importance:

Central Characters
Wang Ben Loy
Ben Loy is the husband of Mei Oi and the son of Wah Gay and Lau Shee. The novel begins when Ben Loy is in his 20s and occupying himself by serving at a restaurant in Stanton and making frequent trips to New York to sleep with various prostitutes. After he marries Mei Oi, he finds himself impotent. This, combined with the humiliation and pain he feels at the discovery of his wife's affair, burdens him with shame and self-doubt. Forgiving, caring, and loving, the text consistently portrays Ben Loy as the "good guy" who is merely plagued by the mistakes of his youth.

Lee Mei Oi
Mei Oi is the stunningly beautiful wife of Ben Loy and the daughter of Lee Gong and Jung Shee, still living in Sunwei, China, Others admire Mei Oi for her comely appearance and her level of education, as schooling for women was rare in her circumstances. Frustrated and hurt by Ben Loy's impotence, Mei Oi disregards the pressures and standards of family and society in order to express herself sexually through her lover, Ah Song. Although Mei Oi transforms negatively throughout the course of the novel – from a sweet, innocent rural girl to a selfish seductress – she reverts to her pleasant characteristics at the conclusion of the novel.

Wang Wah Gay
Wah Gay is Ben Loy's elderly father and Lau Shee's husband. Unable to bring his wife over due to immigration laws, Wah Gay spends his days maintaining his clubhouse, the "Money Come," which serves as the mahjong headquarters for the neighborhood men. Although he cares deeply for Ben Loy, the pressure and control he places upon him only drive him away. Wah Gay and his closest companion, Lee Gong, represent the older generation of Chinese immigrants who continue to idealize traditional values and customs while residing in contemporary America.

Lee Gong
Lee Gong is Mei Oi's slight, elderly father and Jung Shee's husband. He harbors an extremely close bond with Wah Gay, as they traveled from China to America together and shared quarters at Ellis Island as teenagers. His playful and strategic personality impels him to devise a plan to arrange a marriage between Mei Oi and Ben Loy. Although he has a distant relationship from his wife and daughter in China, Lee Gong maintains high expectations for their behavior. Upon cultivating a relationship with Mei Oi, her unconventional behavior shames and disappoints him and he is unable to forgive his daughter for her devastating mistakes.

Ah Song
Ah Song is a youthful-looking and handsome man in his mid-40s. He serves as the Don Juan and the "bad guy" (a foil to Ben Loy) of the story, and is known for his laziness and his reputation with women. Ah Song does not miss a beat when he meets the lovely Mei Oi, and proceeds to seduce the married woman (the first time, questionably by force). Mei Oi's thoughts reveal his true nature, as even the woman who loves him cannot take him seriously. Although she considers him a tender and understanding lover, she realizes that if Ben Loy leaves her, "the baby...would have no one to call father" (211), showing that Mei Oi does not view him as a responsible adult. Finally, the text characterizes Ah Song as the "lone wolf" (222) of the story – in a culture controlled by family ties and power, Ah Song does not have a relative to speak of.

Chinatown neighbors
Chin Yuen
Chin Yuen is Ben Loy's longtime roommate in Stanton and the two men eventually become close friends. Chin Yuen introduces Ben Loy to the seductive world of New York and eventually gives Ben Loy and Mei Oi his apartment to share. Although Ben Loy describes him as a "carefree bachelor" (210) and as his closest friend with a "good heart" (59), he is unaware that Chin Yuen longs to cultivate a relationship with Mei Oi and fantasizes that he is the man she is having an affair with.

Wang Wing Sim
Wing Sim is Eng Shee's husband and Ben Loy's cousin. Although Wing Sim and Ben Loy are far from close, he is protective of his cousin and goes out of his way to help Ben Loy in his time of need. By offering Ben Loy a job and reprimanding Eng Shee for ostracizing Mei Oi, Wing Sim proves to be a genuine and caring character and the most accepting member of Ben Loy's family.

Eng Shee
Eng Shee is Wing Sim's wife. Although she came from the same rural background as Mei Oi, she is uneducated and snobbish to the point that her own husband states that she has a "limited knowledge of everything" (162) and possesses a "narrow point of view" (162). Her overtly rude treatment of Mei Oi reinforces these judgments.

Wang Chuck Ting
Chuck Ting is Wah Gay's cousin and Wing Sim's father. Chuck Ting possesses an impressive amount of power in the business world, as he is the president of the Wang Association as well as numerous other businesses. Chuck Ting has a high regard for the protection and reputation of his family and flexes his power in order to free Wah Gay of consequences when he attacks Ah Song. Although Chuck Ting's actions are not necessarily just, the devotion he has for his family is prominent and admirable.

Mee King
Mee King is an old friend of Wah Gay, as they attended Poy Ying Middle School and even visited whore houses (apparently this is quite the bonding activity!) together in their youth. Both friends are there for one another in their times of need (when Mee King was shot and when Wah Gay hides from the police) and the novel portrays Mee King as an understanding and reliable friend.

Characters in China
Lau Shee
Lau Shee is Wah Gay's wife and Ben Loy's mother. Due to immigration laws, Lau Shee continues to live in Sunwei, China, busying herself with Christianity and fussing over her husband and son although they are many miles away. Her actual appearance in the novel is brief, as she assists Ben Loy in completing the traditional steps necessary to marry Mei Oi. Yet, her presence is felt throughout the novel as various characters, especially Wah Gay and Mei Oi, miss her companionship in America.

Jung Shee
Jung Shee is Lee Gong's wife and Mei Oi's mother. She also lives in China and represents traditional Chinese values. Although she has little effect on the story, Lee Gong's thoughts often dwell on his beloved wife, showing the resentment these immigrant men have for the laws that keep their families apart.

Minor characters
Kuo Ming – Ben Loy and Mei Oi's first child; although the identity of the true father is unknown, Ben Loy considers the baby his own and the newborn served as a bond that made husband and wife closer
Chong Loo – An old rent collector and Chinatown's biggest gossip
Tuck King and Kitchen Master – Cooks at Money Come; Kitchen Master buys Money Come when Wah Gay leaves New York
Dr. Suey – Herb doctor in San Francisco who instructs Ben Loy to "eat a bowl of tea" to treat his impotence
Wang Wah Lim – Wah Gay's elder brother
Bok Hey – Ben Loy's uncle; blessed with three sons: Do Sing, Do Dot, and Do Ming
Aunt Gin Fung – Ben Loy's aunt; matchmaker for the marriage between Ben Loy and Mei Oi
Ling Hing – Mei Oi's uncle; embodies "Old Tradition" of Chinese culture
Wang Fook Ming – Wah Gay's cousin; Vice President of the Wang Association
Ah Mow and Ah Sing – Barbers at Wah Que Barbershop who encourage the gossip of Chong Loo
Lee Sam – Lee Gong's old roommate; in a psychiatric hospital in Long Island after being beaten and robbed in their apartment
Ging Fong – Chinese language secretary in the legal conflict between Wah Gay and Ah Song; also referred to as Third Uncle
George D. Dong – English language secretary
Lao Chuck – One of Wah Gay's many cousins; tells Ah Song to drop charges pressed upon Wah Gay
Ho Soon – President of Ping On Tong
Reverend Fook Ming – Marries Ben Loy and Mei Oi

Setting and historical context
The novel takes place in the 1940s, and the majority of the plot takes place in New York's Chinatown. Segments of the plot occur in other locations as well, including:
Sunwei, China
Stanton, Connecticut (possibly a reference to Stamford, Connecticut?)
Washington, D.C.
Newark, New Jersey
San Francisco, CA

Chu's novel begins right after the close of World War II. Numerous references are made to the Asian American soldiers represented by Ben Loy. After the war, many elderly men were confined to the cities of San Francisco, Seattle, Los Angeles, Boston, and New York City, as the 1882 Chinese Exclusion Act and Immigration Act of 1924 had prevented them from returning to their wives and family in China and also from bringing these family members to the United States. For this reason, many Chinatowns in the USA were "bachelor societies."  This unfortunate predicament is depicted through the old men of the novel, such as Wah Gay and Lee Gong, but it also plays out in the way Mei Oi's arrival affects the entire community. In fact, the conflict of the novel arises from the repeal of the Exclusion Act in 1943, for Mei Oi could not have come to the States before then.

Another aspect of the novel is the effect of Chinese American men on life back in China. Chinese men who had emigrated to the United States were known as gimshunhocks, or "sojourner in Gold Mountain" from the Chinese name for America. These men were highly desirable husbands for young women in China, as is seen in Mei Oi's willingness to marry Ben Loy.

Point of view
The novel is told by a third-person omniscient narrator – one who is able to reach and relay the thoughts, feelings, and actions of the characters. Yet, thoughts and feelings of minor characters are usually withheld in order for readers to focus on relating to the major figures in the novel. There are points in the novel when the reader knows more about a situation or character than anyone in the actual story – this unique situation allows for thorough analysis or characters and the development of suspense.

Structure
Although the novel does not begin at the earliest chronological point of the story (ab ovo), it also does not follow the typical structure of in medias res. It starts near the beginning of the time span of the story, depicting Ben Loy and Mei Oi as a married couple sleeping in the "quiet of the early morning" (9). As this peaceful scene is unnervingly interrupted by a prostitute ringing Ben Loy's doorbell, the purpose of the passage becomes apparent. It highlights the cause of Ben Loy's impotency and the effect this has on Mei Oi, foreshadowing the deterioration of their relationship. By setting an ominous tone and introducing complicated primary characters, the first chapter engages readers and creates a desire to know more about their history and future.

The narrative then jumps back in time to "several months before the wedding" (15) and continues chronologically from this point on. This chronological order is interrupted only after the first chapter when the text reveals an important memory to the reader, usually triggered by something in the character's present environment.  
Ben Loy waited for his turn at the doctor's office...sitting opposite a lady who had followed him in. Momentarily he turned from his magazine to the lady...Shapely legs...The well proportioned legs drew his attention and reminded him of one day in Calcutta. (86) 
With this sudden remembrance, the narration describes Ben Loy's rendezvous with a prostitute through third person direct discourse. After this scene, the story returns to normal, chronological order. Although these memories are rare, they help portray character traits and provide history to explain current situations.

Syntax and diction
By keeping sentences relatively simple and throwing in various cultural terms and phrases, Chu makes his novel both authentic and readable.  
Numerous instances of insults and bad language destroy any stiff formality and provide readers with an honest perspective of life in an overwhelmingly male society:
Ex: "Wow his mother/father", "Go sell your ass", "sonovabitch", "dead girl/boy" (all used numerous times)
Text parallels the speech of Asian Americans by sporadically including Sze Yup dialect – Chinese terms and unfamiliar phrases:
Ex: "You have a warm heart" (173), "green hat" (127), "Don't stand on ceremony" (164), "Fatty water should not be permitted to flow into another's rice paddy" (158)

Chu makes the stylistic choice to italicize certain words and phrases of his text. This occurs while depicting:
letters
interior monologues (in brief glimpses into thoughts of primary characters)
songs
most Chinese terms
These italicized sections of the text represent the most personal glimpses into the characters of the novel. As letters, free discourse, and songs allow round characters to reveal a deeper side of themselves, the terms provide readers with a taste of Chinese culture.

Finally, Chu portrays even the most violent and sexual of scenes with beautiful and minimalist description. By avoiding graphic descriptions, these passages remain tasteful and allow readers to use their own imaginations to obtain closure.
[Ben Loy beats Mei Oi] "He...picked up his leather slipper from the floor. His hand must have come down at least half a dozen times" (146).
[Ah Song rapes Mei Oi] "In the kitchen the white-enameled pot stood mute and unused, the lone cup of tea on the table forgotten and untouched. Later when they both got up, Mei Oi started to sob, very softly" (99).
[Wah Gay cuts off Ah Song's ear] "Ah Song's left ear fell to the floor" (183).
These instances not only give readers the unique chance to assume and create their own details, but also reflect values of politeness and privacy in Chinese culture.

Formal techniques
Chu utilizes various literary techniques to make his story come alive for readers.

Metaphor:
[Ben Loy] "He was a stranger in his own town" (207).
[Ben Loy's depression] "The black hand of darkness seemed ready to swoop down from the clouds to grab him" (207).

Simile:
[Snow in New York] "White flakes floated down upon the street...like white-grained rice husks flying from the milling closet" (35-6).
[Time Wah Gay and Lau Shee spent apart] "The years have passed like the mere closing and opening of the eye" (115).
[Money Come] "...the room was like a dimly-lit tunnel" (139).
[Ben Loy's reaction to the prospect of Mei Oi's affair] "The question exploded on Ben Loy like ten thousand firecrackers" (140).
[Ben Loy's depression] "Now this boulder came tumbling out of the sky, like an exhausted satellite, and crash-landed on Wah Gay's head" (143).
[Moving to Stanton] "It would be like starting anew, changing a spoiled blouse for a new one" (151).

Hyperbole:
[Snow in New York] "Everything was white. The whole world was white" (36).
[Distance between New York and Sunwei] "...ten thousand folds of mountains away from home" (66).
[Ben Loy's depression] "His head spun with pains. Big pains. As big as a boulder" (143).
[Lee Gong's reaction] "Lee Gong let go a typhoon-sized sigh of relief" (151).

Oxymoron:
"He gently dropped her on the...bed" (99).
[Ah Song makes love to Mei Oi through a combination of force and romance]

Metonymy
In Sunwei, the "Golden Mountain" discussed represents America.

Irony:
Dramatic -"He immediately compared Mei Oi to Gim Peng Moy. Are they the same type of woman?  No...he consoled himself" (121).
[Readers are aware of Mei Oi's infidelity but Ben Loy is not]
Chin Yuen is the only one Ben Loy confides in about Mei Oi's affair, but readers know that Chin Yuen fantasizes about having an affair with Mei Oi.
Situational – Although Wah Gay attacks Ah Song, Ah Song is the one who is exiled for five years.
Verbal – "Everybody likes sex, you know" (121).  [Ben Loy is, in fact, impotent]

Major themes
Appearance vs. Reality:
On the surface, Ben Loy appears like a "good boy", yet he is covering up secrets of a promiscuous past.
Mei Oi is from China and therefore is expected to be good, courteous, and understanding; instead she resumes the behavior of a jook sing girl.

Old generation versus new generation:
Ben Loy and Mei Oi are under constant pressure from their parents and society to maintain traditional values while living in contemporary America.
Other contrasts: Ben Loy visiting a Chinese herb doctor as well as an American doctor; Ben Loy and Mei Oi's marriage being both arranged and mutually chosen

Importance of family:
Carrying on the family name and reputation is important, therefore grandchildren are anticipated and boy babies are valued over girl babies
The text even portrays family ties overriding the law. Although Wah Gay attacks Ah Song, he receives no punishment and Ah Song is exiled.
Ah Song, who has no family to speak of, states the amount of power placed on family ties:  "A big stone will crush to death a crab" (226).

Roles of Men and Women in Society:
It is only socially accepted for a man to have an affair:
"Husbands are different...They can go out and sleep with another woman and we woman folks can't do anything about it" (168).
Therefore, Mei Oi becomes the "man" in the marriage when she has an affair; this is reflected in Ben Loy's loss of manhood.
Ben Loy regains his masculinity only when he establishes himself as an independent person and as the dominant one in the relationship.

Motifs

Vengeance:
Vicious cycle portrayed most aptly through Wah Gay attacking Ah Song

Being Lost:
Both Ben Loy and Mei Oi are described as "being lost in a forest", showing their confusement:
"...Ben Loy seemed like a little boy, lost in the wilderness, not knowing which way to turn" (126).

"...she [Mei Oi] was like a child lost in thick forest" (129).

Luck:
Races and mah jong
Many characters give luck credit for events: "He attributed to good luck the peaceful situation of his first case of love theft" (148).

Symbols

Red Book:
The Fourth Uncle consults this to confirm the most auspicious day for the marriage
Represents traditional practices of the Old Generation

Movies/Theatre:
Represents an escape from reality for Mei Oi:
"Mei Oi had discovered that the movies had a relaxing influence on her; so that, after a night out, her inner frustrations became less compelling" (83).
Represents a reminder of reality for Ben Loy:
While watching the opera "Gim Peng Moy", he relates the disloyal protagonist to Mei Oi

The city:
Represents temptation, evil, loss of innocence

New York:
Represents parental supervision, reckless mistakes of youth

San Francisco:
Represents emancipation, new beginnings, rebirth

Eating a Cup of Tea:
Represents reinstating masculinity and independence

Literary significance and reception
When the novel was first published in 1961, reviews denounced it, deeming the content offensive and the language "tasteless and raw" (2). Chu's work was ignored for a decade and finally rediscovered in the 1970s. It is now considered a primary work in Asian American literature, and Louis Chu has been praised repeatedly for creating an honest portrayal of Chinese American culture. Due to its influence and popularity, the Pan Asian Repertory Theatre in New York City produced the novel for the stage and Wayne Wang directed a film version in 1989.

Critical articles
Chen, Xiangyang. "Constructions of Chinese Identity in Eat a Bowl of Tea and Chinese Box."  Re-Reading America: Changes and Challenges. Ed. Weihe Zhong and Rui Han; Cheltenham, England: Reardon; 2004. pp. 215–26
Chua, Cheng Lok; "Golden Mountain: Chinese Versions of the American Dream in Lin Yutang, Louis Chu, and Maxine Hong Kingston" Ethnic Groups 1982; 4 (1-2): 33–59.
Hsiao, Ruth Y. "Facing the Incurable: Patriarchy in Eat a Bowl of Tea." Reading the Literatures of Asian America. Ed. Shirley Geok-lin Lim and Amy Ling. Philadelphia: Temple UP; 1992. pp. 151–62
Li, Shu-yan; "Otherness and Transformation in Eat a Bowl of Tea and Crossings." MELUS 1993–1994 Winter; 18 (4): 99–110.
Ling, Jinqi; "Reading for Historical Specificities: Gender Negotiations in Louis Chu's Eat a Bowl of Tea." MELUS 1995 Spring; 20 (1): 35–51.
By: Oakes, Pamela J. "Filial Duty and Family Survival in Timothy Mo's The Monkey King and Sour Sweet." Bearing Dream, Shaping Visions: Asian Pacific American Perspectives. Ed. Linda A. Revilla, Gail M. Nomura, Shawn Wong and Shirley Hune. Pullman, WA: Washington State UP; 1993. pp. 141–52
Prigg, Benson Webster; Transactional Analysis: A Viable Approach for Discussing Human Autonomy in Fictional Texts Dissertation Abstracts International, 1991 Apr; 51 (10): 3414A. Bowling Green State U.
By: Shih, David. "Eat a Bowl of Tea by Louis Chu." A Resource Guide to Asian American Literature. Ed. Sau-ling Cynthia Wong and Stephen H. Sumida. New York, NY: Modern Language Association of America; 2001. pp. 45–53

References

External links
Brief description of Chu's background and the public's response to Eat a Bowl of Tea
Author profile on Louis Chu

Brief summary, rating, and reader’s reviews

American satirical novels
1961 American novels
American novels adapted into films
Chinese-American novels
Novels set in New York City
Novels set in Connecticut